The 1863 State of the Union Address was written by the 16th president of the United States, Abraham Lincoln, and delivered to the United States Congress, on Tuesday, December 8, 1863, amid the ongoing American Civil War. He said, "The efforts of disloyal citizens of the United States to involve us in foreign wars to aid an inexcusable insurrection have been unavailing," referring to the citizens of the Confederate States of America, and their failed efforts to bring the Emperor of France, Napoleon III, or the British Monarch, Queen Victoria, onto their side. He ended with, "The movements by State action for emancipation in several of the States not included in the emancipation proclamation are matters of profound gratulation."

References

State of the Union addresses
Presidency of Abraham Lincoln
Works by Abraham Lincoln
38th United States Congress
State of the Union Address
State of the Union Address
State of the Union Address
State of the Union Address
Politics of the American Civil War
December 1863 events
State of the Union